The  is a railway line operated by East Japan Railway Company (JR East) in western Tokyo, Japan. It links Tachikawa and the Chūō Line with the town of Okutama. Many Chūō Line trains operate via the Ōme Line to Ōme Station, providing non-stop service to Tokyo Station.

The section between Ōme and Oku-Tama is now nicknamed as the "Tokyo Adventure Line (東京アドベンチャーライン)".

Services

Ōme Line Local 
Local trains stop at all stations. However, they rarely run along the entire Ōme Line, with services splitting at Ōme Station.

Through services 
The Ōme Line, at times, runs through services along the Chūō Rapid, Itsukaichi, and Hachikō lines. Supplemental trains during the peak season may also run along the Nambu Line. Trains that operate only on the Ōme Line have "Ōme-Itsukaichi Line" displayed at the front.

 Chūō - Ōme Line through service: Some Chūō Line trains operate through service to the Ōme Line via Tachikawa. Most through services only go as far as Ōme, and stop at all stations on the Ōme Line, except the Holiday Rapid Okutama (See below). There are two other through service variations which uses the Ōme Line as an intermediate line, which are shown below.
 Chūō - Ōme - Itsukaichi Line through service: At rush hours, few Chūō Line trains run through services between Tokyo and the Itsukaichi Line via Haijima. These services are always joined with another through service train, which couples / decouples at Haijima. During morning rush, some trains from Musashi-Itsukaichi on the Itsukaichi Line, and another train from Ōme on the Ōme Line, or from Hakonegasaki / Komagawa on the Hachiko Line, couple at Haijima, and head for Tokyo. During evening rush, the reverse occurs.
 Chūō - Ōme - Hachiko Line through service: As mentioned above, there are through services from Tokyo on the Chūō Line to the Hachiko Line, via the Ōme Line. These trains terminate at Hakonegasaki or Komagawa.
 Ōme - Itsukaichi Line through service: Some Itsukaichi Line operate through service to the Ōme Line via Haijima. They operate between Musashi-Itsukaichi and Tachikawa. Note that these trains do not go on the Chūō Line.

Ōme Limited Express 
The Ōme Limited Express (特急おうめ) is limited express train service for commuters on the Chūō Rapid Line and Ōme Line. The train operates on weekdays only. Prior to 16 March 2019, this train operated as the Ōme Liner (青梅ライナー)

Holiday Rapid Okutama．Akigawa 

Holiday Rapid Okutama and Holiday Rapid Akigawa services run on weekends from Tokyo. See their article for more information.

Station list 
 All stations are located in Tokyo.
 Local, rapid, and special rapid trains stop at all stations.
 On the track column, stations where trains can pass one another are marked "∥", "◇", "∨", and "∧", and those where trains cannot pass each other at stations marked "｜".

Rolling stock 
 E233-0 series
 209-1000 series

Services on the Ōme Line are usually formed of E233-0 series 10-car / 6+4 car EMUs. However, while 209-1000 series trains usually only run on the Chuo Line (Rapid) between Tokyo and Takao stations, on rare occasions (such as a shortage of train sets due to an accident) they may also run on the Ome Line as far as Ome station. Due to the lack of passenger-operated door controls on these sets all doors open at each station on these sets.

History

The section between Tachikawa and Ōme was opened in 1894 by the Ōme Railway as a  gauge line, extended 2 km as a freight-only section to Hinatawada the following year. A further freight-only section opened to Miyanohira in 1914, and to Futamatao in 1920. Passenger services were extended to Miyanohira in 1923, the same year the entire line was electrified at 1,200 V DC. The line was further extended to Mitake in 1929, when the company changed its name to the Ōme Electric Railway Co. and the voltage raised to 1,500 V DC in 1930. Passenger services were extended to Mitake in 1935.

The company was nationalized on 1 April 1944, the same year that the Tachikawa to Nagakami section was double-tracked.

The Okutama Electric Railway was constructing a line from Mitake to Hikawa (now Okutama) when it was nationalised, and the line opened on 1 July 1944, creating the present-day Ōme Line.

The Nakagami to Haijima section was double-tracked in 1946, and direct services to Tokyo commenced in 1949. The Haijima to Higashi-Ōme section was double-tracked between 1961 and 1962, CTC signalling was commissioned in 1971, and freight services ceased in 1998.

On 20 August 2016, station numbering introduced with stations being assigned station numbers between JC51 (Nishi-Tachikawa) and JC74 (Oku-Tama).

Former connecting lines
 Oku-Tama Station: The Tokyo Waterworks Bureau operated a 7 km line to the Ogouchi dam during its construction between 1952 and 1957. It featured 23 tunnels and 23 bridges. In 1963 it was transferred to the Seibu Railway, which transferred it to the Okutama Limestone Quarrying Co. in 1978, and although the line is now known as the Mizune Freight Line, it has been out of service for some time.

Future developments
In February 2015, JR East announced plans to introduce Green (first class) cars on Chuo Line (Rapid) and through-running Ome Line services from fiscal 2020. This will involve adding two bilevel Green cars to 10- and 6-car E233-0 series EMU sets, forming 12- and 8-car sets. Work is now undergoing to lengthen station platforms and depot facilities to handle the longer trains.

References

External links

 Stations of the Ōme Line (JR East) 

 
Lines of East Japan Railway Company
Railway lines in Tokyo
1067 mm gauge railways in Japan
Railway lines opened in 1894